Juasseh is a state constituency in Negeri Sembilan, Malaysia, that has been represented in the Negeri Sembilan State Legislative Assembly.

The state constituency was first contested in 1986 and is mandated to return a single Assemblyman to the Negeri Sembilan State Legislative Assembly under the first-past-the-post voting system. , the State Assemblyman for Juasseh is Ismail Lasim from the Barisan Nasional (BN).

Definition 
The Juasseh constituency contains the polling districts of Kampong Tengkek, Kampong Tapak, Kampong Sungai Jelutong, Kampong Padang Lebar, Kampong Terentang, Juasseh Tengah, Bukit Gelugor, Kampong Terusan, Pekan Juasseh, Pelangai and Kampong Gentam.

Representation history

Election results
The electoral results for the Juasseh state constituency in 2008, 2013 and 2018 are as follows.

References

Negeri Sembilan state constituencies